Milan Vušurović (born 18 April 1995) is a Montenegrin professional footballer who plays as a midfielder for FK Dečić.

Career
On 7 July 2022, Vušurović joined Saudi Arabian club Al-Orobah.

Honours
Lovćen
Montenegrin Cup: 2013–14

Budućnost Podgorica
Montenegrin First League: 2016–17

References

External links

1995 births
Living people
Sportspeople from Cetinje
Association football midfielders
Montenegrin footballers
Montenegro youth international footballers
Montenegro under-21 international footballers
FK Lovćen players
FK Budućnost Podgorica players
Riga FC players
FC Vereya players
FC Botev Vratsa players
FK Napredak Kruševac players
FK Radnik Bijeljina players
FK Borac Banja Luka players
Al-Orobah FC players
FK Dečić players
Montenegrin First League players
Latvian Higher League players
First Professional Football League (Bulgaria) players
Serbian SuperLiga players
Premier League of Bosnia and Herzegovina players
Saudi First Division League players
Montenegrin expatriate footballers
Expatriate footballers in Latvia
Montenegrin expatriate sportspeople in Latvia
Expatriate footballers in Bulgaria
Montenegrin expatriate sportspeople in Bulgaria
Expatriate footballers in Serbia
Montenegrin expatriate sportspeople in Serbia
Expatriate footballers in Bosnia and Herzegovina
Montenegrin expatriate sportspeople in Bosnia and Herzegovina
Expatriate footballers in Saudi Arabia
Montenegrin expatriate sportspeople in Saudi Arabia